Ibim is a village in southern Israel. Located near Sderot, it falls under the jurisdiction of Sha'ar HaNegev Regional Council.

Etymology
Ibim is a biblical name derived from verse 6:11 in the Song of Solomon; "I went down to the nut orchard to look at the blossoms of the valley'"

History
Originally a farm, in 1953 the center for Sha'ar HaNegev Regional Council was established on the site. In 1992 a student village with the same name was established in order to provide dwellings for immigrants from Ethiopia and the former Soviet Union who were studying at the nearby Sapir Academic College.

References

Villages in Israel
Populated places established in 1992
Gaza envelope
Populated places in Southern District (Israel)
1992 establishments in Israel
Ethiopian-Jewish culture in Israel
Russian-Jewish culture in Israel